Eduardo Eurnekian (born 4 December 1932) is an Argentine billionaire businessman of Armenian descent. , he is the fifth richest person in Argentina, with an estimated net worth of US$1.4 billion.

Early life
Eduardo Eurnekian was born to Armenian immigrant parents on 4 December 1932. His family established a textile manufacturer which prospered with the Argentine economy and became an important supplier to international sporting apparel firm Puma; but which, like many Argentine textile makers, nearly collapsed after Economy Minister José Alfredo Martínez de Hoz's round of free trade and deregulatory policies exposed the real value of the business, in 1981.

Career
The Eurnekian family reportedly borrowed heavily from the former Argentine small business lender, BANADE, and in 1988, Eduardo Eurnekian purchased "Cablevisión S.A," then a failing local cable TV station. His investment became increasingly lucrative following Economy Minister Domingo Cavallo's implementation of the Convertibility Plan in 1991, which brought financial and price stability to Argentina during the 1990s. In 1994 he sold a 51% stake in Cablevision S.A. (by then Argentina's second-largest cable operator), to Tele-Communications Inc. for US$350 million and in 1997, netted US$320 million by selling most of his remaining shares to local investment giant CEI Citicorp Holdings SA.

Eurnekian also held controlling interest in "América TV", four radio stations and a Buenos Aires financial daily, El Cronista. "Aeropuertos Argentina 2000," a consortium led by Eurnekian won a 30-year concession in 1998 to run 33 of the Argentina's main airports. He also bought the Howard Johnson's master franchise in Argentina from Cendant, and invested in a regional airline company, LAPA.

Investments in Armenia
On 17 December 2001, Eurnekian's Corporación América signed a 30-year concession agreement with the Armenian government for the management of operations of Zvartnots International Airport, which is Armenia's largest airport. The company launched the construction of a new terminal which brought the airport into conformity with international standards. The total cost of the project was more than $50 million.

Eurnekian unveiled plans to invest millions of dollars into Armenia's agribusiness sector as he set up a joint venture with a local firm. Senior executives from Tierras de Armenia, a Yerevan-based company belonging to Eurnekian, and the Max Group (owned by Harutiun Pambukian, a parliamentarian close to former President Robert Kocharian), reported a US$25 million joint venture to develop 60 km2 (24 mi2) of arid land in the southern Armavir region into fruit orchards and a fruit processing plant.

Eurnekian has built an almost $1 billion media empire since the early 1990s and is now the majority owner of a consortium operating 76 airports worldwide, mostly across Argentina and elsewhere in South America as well as in Armenia. He also owns 2,000 square kilometres of land and food processing factories in northern Argentina.

Awards
He has been awarded as the "Business Man of the year" in 1995. In 1999 he received in Italy the "Leonardo Award", given to the foreign businessman of the year. He also received the highest awards in Armenia for his activities. In 2017 he has been awarded the title of the National Hero of Armenia. In 2012 he was awarded the Oslo Business for Peace Award in Oslo, Norway. In December 2020, he was appointed as Honorary Officer of the Order of the British Empire (OBE), for services to UK/Argentina relations.

On February 4, 2023 the Mayor of the city of Florence, Dario Nardella, has handed over the keys to the city to Eurnekian. “His Argentine and Armenian descent and the fact that he created the Raoul Wallenberg Foundation (…) is a very important symbol for us,” the Mayor said.

Personal life
Eurnekian is single, and his "chosen successor" is his nephew Martin Eurnekian.

See also
 Zvartnots International Airport
 Shirak International Airport
 Corporación América

References
Notes

Citations 

1932 births
Living people
Argentine people of Armenian descent
Argentine businesspeople
Armenian businesspeople
Argentine billionaires
Armenian billionaires
National Hero of Armenia
Honorary Officers of the Order of the British Empire